Athletics competitions at the 1961 Bolivarian Games
were held in Barranquilla,
Colombia, in December, 1961.  

A detailed history of the early editions of the Bolivarian Games between 1938
and 1989 was published in a book written (in Spanish) by José Gamarra
Zorrilla, former president of the Bolivian Olympic Committee, and first
president (1976-1982) of ODESUR.  Gold medal winners from Ecuador were published by the Comité Olímpico Ecuatoriano.

A total of 30 events were contested, 21 by men and 9 by women.

Medal summary

Medal winners were published.

Men

Women

Medal table (unofficial)

References

Athletics at the Bolivarian Games
International athletics competitions hosted by Colombia
Bolivarian Games
1961 in Colombian sport